GodsWar may refer to:
 GodsWar, a.k.a. Time of Troubles (Forgotten Realms), in  Dungeons & Dragons games
 GodsWar Online, from Internet Gaming Gate and set in ancient Greece